Conestoga Mall may refer to:

Conestoga Mall (Waterloo, Ontario)
Conestoga Mall (Grand Island, Nebraska)